The 1977 Dunedin mayoral election was part of the New Zealand local elections held that same year. In 1977, elections were held for the Mayor of Dunedin plus other local government positions including twelve city councillors. The polling was conducted using the standard first-past-the-post electoral method.

Background
Councillor Cliff Skeggs was elected Mayor of Dunedin to succeed Jim Barnes, who stood down from the mayoralty but was elected as a councillor. He defeated councillor Dorothy Fraser of the Labour Party, who was re-elected to the Hospital Board of which she was chairman. Former Citizens' councillor Iona Williams also contested to mayoralty, polling higher than any independent mayoral candidate since 1933.

Results
The following table shows the results for the election:

References

Mayoral elections in Dunedin
Dunedin
Politics of Dunedin
1970s in Dunedin
October 1977 events in New Zealand